Sokatisewin Sakahikan 224 is an Indian reserve of the Peter Ballantyne Cree Nation in Saskatchewan. It is near Sokatisewin Lake.

References

Indian reserves in Saskatchewan
Division No. 18, Saskatchewan
Peter Ballantyne Cree Nation